A Hawaiian home land is an area held in trust for Native Hawaiians by the state of Hawaii under the Hawaiian Homes Commission Act of 1920.

History
Upon the 1893 overthrow of the Hawaiian Kingdom, the idea for "Hawaiian Homelands" was first born. In his testimony before Congress regarding the Hawaiian Islands on January 3, 1894, William Alexander reported:

 President Dole [of the Republic of Hawaii] and his colleagues have elaborated a plan for giving the Kanakas homesteads out of the Crown lands, not transferable, and further this  condition of occupation.

The law mandating this, passed by the U.S. Congress on July 9, 1921, was called the "Hawaiian Homes Commission Act" (HHCA) and, with amendments, is still in effect today. The act is often also attributed to the year 1920, when it was written. The avowed purpose of the Hawaiian Homes Commission Act was to rehabilitate Native Hawaiians, particularly in returning them to the land to maintain traditional ties to the land. The Hawaiian politicians who testified in favor of the act specifically referred to the devastation of the Hawaiian population and the loss of the land, and the need for Hawaiians to be able to grow traditional crops such as kalo (taro).

The Hawaiian Homes Commission Act included a controversial definition of "Native Hawaiians" as persons with 50% or more Hawaiian blood. Prince Kūhiō Kalanianaole, the territory's non-voting delegate to Congress, wanted a blood quantum of no less than 1/32.

Primary responsibility for administering the trust has rested with:
1921–1960: the Hawaiian Homes Commission (a federal agency)
1960–present: the Department of Hawaiian Home Lands (DHHL, a state agency)
That is, responsibility was transferred to the state level after Hawaii became a state in 1959.
The U.S. federal government nonetheless retains significant oversight responsibilities, including the exclusive right to sue for breach of trust.

Purpose
Section 101, "Purpose", of the Hawaiian Homes Commission Act explains the aims of the Hawaiian Homelands program as follows:

 (a) ... to enable native Hawaiians to return to their lands in order to fully support self-sufficiency for native Hawaiians and the self-determination of native Hawaiians in the administration of this Act, and the preservation of the values, traditions, and culture of native Hawaiians.
 (b) The principal purposes of this Act include but are not limited to:
(1) Establishing a permanent land base for the benefit and use of native Hawaiians, upon which they may live, farm, ranch, and otherwise engage in commercial or industrial or any other activities as authorized in this Act;
(2) Placing native Hawaiians on the lands set aside under this Act in a prompt and efficient manner and assuring long-term tenancy to beneficiaries of this Act and their successors;
(3) Preventing alienation of the fee title to the lands set aside under this Act so that these lands will always be held in trust for continued use by native Hawaiians in perpetuity;
(4) Providing adequate amounts of water and supporting infrastructure, so that homestead lands will always be usable and accessible; and
(5) Providing financial support and technical assistance to native Hawaiian beneficiaries of this Act so that by pursuing strategies to enhance economic self-sufficiency and promote community-based development, the traditions, culture and quality of life of native Hawaiians shall be forever self-sustaining.
(c) In recognition of the solemn trust created by this Act, and the historical government to government relationship between the United States and Kingdom of Hawaii, the United States and the State of Hawaii hereby acknowledge the trust established under this Act and affirm their fiduciary duty to faithfully administer the provisions of this Act on behalf of the native Hawaiian beneficiaries of the Act.
(d) Nothing in this Act shall be construed to:
(1) Affect the rights of the descendants of the indigenous citizens of the Kingdom of Hawaii to seek redress of any wrongful activities associated with the overthrow of the Kingdom of Hawaii; or
(2) Alter the obligations of the United States and the State of Hawaii to carry out their public trust responsibilities under section 5 of the Admission Act to native Hawaiians and other descendants of the indigenous citizens of the Kingdom of Hawaii. [L 1990, c 349, §1]

Hawaiian Homelands

 Anahola-Kamalomalo
 Auwaiolimu-Kalawahine-Kewalo-Papakolea
 Hanapepe
 Hoolehua-Palaau
 Honokaia
 Honokohau
 Honomu-Kuhua
 Humuula
 Kahikinui
 Kalamaula
 Kalaoa
 Kalaupapa
 Kamaoa-Puueo
 Kamiloloa
 Kamoku-Kapulena
 Kaniohale
 Kapaa
 Kapaakea
 Kapalama
 Kapolei
 Kaumana
 Kawaihae
 Keanae
 Kealakehe
 Keaukaha
 Kekaha
 Keoniki
 Kula
 Lahaina
 Lalamilo
 Lualualei
 Makakupia
 Makuu
 Moiliili
 Moloaa
 Nanakuli
 Nienie
 Olaa
 Panaewa
 Pauahi
 Paukukalo
 Pihonua
 Ponohawai
 Princess Kahanu Estates Association
 Puukapu
 Puunene
 Puna
 Shafter Flats
 Ualapue
 Ulupalakua
 Waianae
 Waiohinu
 Waiakea
 Waiehu
 Waikoloa-Waialeale
 Wailau
 Wailua
 Wailua
 Wailuku
 Waimanalo
 Waimanu
 Waimea

See also
Indian reservation
Indian reserve, Canada
Ranchería
Rancherie, Canada
 Right to homeland
Aboriginal title
Politics of Hawaii

References

Further reading
Hawaii Advisory Committee to the U.S. Commission on Civil Rights: Tatibouet, Andre S. (chairperson) et al. (December 1991). A Broken Trust. The Hawaiian Homelands Program: Seventy Years of Failure of the Federal and State Governments to Protect the Civil Rights of Native Hawaiians. U.S. Government Printing Office: 1991—617-651/41065.
Maps of Properties held in trust by the Department of Hawaiian Home Lands

External links
 Hawaiian Homes Commission Act, 1920 as amended from the Hawaiian Department of Hawaiian Home Lands
 Hawaiian Homes Commission Act, 1920 (PDF/details) as amended in the GPO Statute Compilations collection

1921 in law
Aboriginal title in the United States
American Indian reservations
History of racial segregation in the United States
Indigenous land rights in Hawaii
Lands reserved for indigenous peoples
Legal history of Hawaii
Native American topics
Native Hawaiian history
Politics of Hawaii
Political divisions of the United States
Types of administrative division
United States federal Native American legislation